In Greek mythology, Argeus (Ancient Greek: Ἀργεύς) was a king of Argos  of the Abantiad Dynasty, the son of Megapenthes, and possibly the father of Anaxagoras.

Note

References 

 Pausanias, Description of Greece with an English Translation by W.H.S. Jones, Litt.D., and H.A. Ormerod, M.A., in 4 Volumes. Cambridge, MA, Harvard University Press; London, William Heinemann Ltd. 1918. . Online version at the Perseus Digital Library
 Pausanias, Graeciae Descriptio. 3 vols. Leipzig, Teubner. 1903.  Greek text available at the Perseus Digital Library.

Princes in Greek mythology
Kings of Argos
Kings in Greek mythology
Abantiades (mythology)